Diane Brentari is an American linguist who specializes in sign languages and American Sign Language in particular.

Education and career 
Brentari received her PhD in Linguistics from the University of Chicago in 1990. Her dissertation, entitled Theoretical Foundations of American Sign Language Phonology, was supervised by John Goldsmith.

She is the Mary K. Werkman Professor of Linguistics and co-director of the Center for Gesture, Sign, and Language at the University of Chicago. She held a position at University of California-Davis, and then led the Sign Language program at Purdue University before coming to the University of Chicago in 2011.

Brentari's scholarship focuses on the phonology, morphology, and prosody of sign languages.

Honors 
In 2019, Brentari's article "The Noun-Verb Distinction in Established and Emergent Sign Systems" (co-authored with Natasha Abner, Molly Flaherty, Katelyn Stangl, Marie Coppola, and Susan Goldin-Meadow) received the Best Paper in the Linguistic Society of America's Language Award.

In 2020, Brentari was awarded a Guggenheim Fellowship for the project Observing the Creation of Language.

Brentari was inducted as a Fellow of the Linguistic Society of America in 2022.

Selected publications

Books

*

Chapters and articles

References 

Women linguists
University of Chicago alumni
Fellows of the Linguistic Society of America
University of Chicago faculty
Phonologists
University of California, Davis faculty
Purdue University faculty
Linguists of sign languages
Living people
Year of birth missing (living people)